Filippo Barigioni (1690–1753) was an Italian sculptor and architect working in the Late Baroque tradition.

Bariogioni was born in Rome. His career was spent largely on papal commissions, including aqueducts and fountains, in and around Rome. As a professor of architecture at the Accademia di San Luca, his most important pupil was Carlo Marchionni.

He died in Rome in 1753.

Main works
Fontana della Rotonda (1711). The fountain setting for the Egyptian obelisk that faces the Pantheon was commissioned by the Albani pope Clement XI; Barigioni was commissioned to re-erect an Egyptian obelisk (the Obelisco Macuteo) in the place of the central vase of Giacomo Della Porta's fountain (1575) in the centre of Piazza della Rotonda. Luigi Amici carved the four dolphins at the base of the pedestal (illustration). The ensemble was adapted in 1880.
Palazzo Testa-Piccolomini (1718)
Aqueduct and municipal fountain at Nepi (1727). The spectacular buttressed piers of the aqueduct's high arches are still a monumental sight in Nepi. Barigioni also designed the public fountain, set into a niche in the façade of the Palazzo Communale, where the aqueduct's water issues from the heraldic tower of Pope Benedict XIII.
Fountain in Corneto (modern Tarquinia) (1727), celebrating the Conti pope Innocent XIII.
Façade for church of San Gregorio della Divina Pietà (1727–29). Barigioni designed the façade for the  church in Piazza Monte Savello, near the Theater of Marcellus, first mentioned in twelfth-century. The church stood just outside the  Roman Ghetto; the inscriptions in Hebrew and Latin on the scroll above the door were intended "che rimproverano la perfidia ed ostinazione degli Ebrei" according to Giuseppe Vasi's Itinerario 1761. (illustration).
Church of Sant'Andrea delle Fratte. (1736). Right transept altar with the bronze and marble image of S. Francesco di Paola (Titi-Bottari 1763). The altarpiece is by Paris Nogari, the stucco angels by Giovanni Battista Maini.
Velletri, Palazzo Comunale, (completed 1741). The town hall, begun in 1572 by Giacomo della Porta to a design by Jacopo Barozzi da Vignola, was completed by Barigioni.
Church of San Marco (1744). Interior redecorations, Cardinal Angelo Querini.
Exedra in the courtyard of the Palazzo Nuovo of the Campidoglio  (1734), with the arms of Clement XII, celebrating the installation of the Musei Capitolini.
Monument to Queen Maria Clementina Sobieska (1739–42), St Peter's, Rome. He designed the monument, which was executed by the sculptor Pietro Bracci; the realistic and theatrical white and colored marble funeral monument commemorated the consort of the Stuart pretender James Francis Stuart.
Chapel of S. Fabiano, in the Church of San Sebastian on the Appian Way, erected to glorify the Albani family to designs of Carlo Maratta, was executed by Carlo Fontana, Alessandro Specchi and Barigioni (Titi-Bottari 1763; TCI 1965395)
Church of Madonna del Pascolo and Ss. Sergius and Bacchus. High altar designed by Barigioni (Titi-Bottari 1763).

Notes

References
Filippo Titi, Descrizione delle Pitture, Sculture e Architetture esposte in Roma, rivista da Giovanni Bottari, 1763 References to Barigioni
Roberto Piperno, brief linked list of Barigioni's commissions
Chris Nyborg, "Churches of Rome: S. Marco"
Chris Nyborg, "Churches of Rome: S. Maria della Pietà" (S. Gregorio a Ponte Quattro Capi)

1690 births
1753 deaths
Artists from Rome
18th-century Italian architects
Architects from Lazio
Italian Baroque sculptors
Italian Baroque architects